Azahares para tu boda ("Orange Blossom for your Wedding") is a 1950 Mexican film. It stars Sara García.

It is a remake of the 1939 Argentine film Así es la vida.

Cast

Fernando Soler: Ernesto
Sara García: Eloísa
Joaquín Pardavé: Don Bodroz
Marga López: Felicia
Domingo Soler: Alberto
Andrés Soler: Sr. Cabrera
Fernando Soto: Rosendo 
Rodolfo Landa: Luis
Hortensia Constance: Adela
Margarita Cortés: Felipa
Anabelle Gutiérrez: Margarita 
Freddy Fernández: Eduardo - young 
Joaquín Cordero: Eduardo - adult
Eduardo Noriega: Carlos
 Queta Lavat
 Alfonso Zayas

References

External links
 

1950 films
1950s Spanish-language films
Mexican black-and-white films
Mexican comedy-drama films
1950 comedy-drama films
1950s Mexican films